Prisoner of Society is a 2018 Georgian short documentary film directed by Rati Tsiteladze. It is nominated for the European Film Academy for Best Short Film at the 31st European Film Awards

Critical reception
British Film Institute (BFI) called it "A provocative and confrontational" in Sight & Sound and  named it among 10 short films to watch.

The film won Best Documentary Award and qualified for the 91st Academy Awards at Tampere FF where there jury called it "riveting intimate documentary that is important to discuss not only in Europe but throughout the world."

Seminci jury praised Tsiteladze's effective cinematographic mastery "the director overcomes his limitation of material resources to reflect with completeness of the complex history of life. The transgender protagonist is a prisoner of her body, of her parents, of society, of her own house, which reminds us that we are all prisoners of our prejudices and our ignorance.”

Awards and nominations

References

External links
 
 

2018 films
2018 short documentary films
2018 LGBT-related films
Films about gender
Documentary films about LGBT topics
Transgender-related films
Films shot in Georgia (country)
Documentary films from Georgia (country)